Peter Cullen (born 1941) is a Canadian voice actor.

Peter Cullen may also refer to:

 Peter Cullen (athlete) (1932–2010), British athlete
 Peter Cullen (scientist) (1943–2008), Australian water scientist

See also
 List of people named Peter
 Cullen (surname)